Bradley Adam Rubinstein (Hebrew name: Binyamin Adam) is an English-Israeli Orthodox Jewish guitarist, songwriter, and producer based in Beit Shemesh, Israel. Initially gaining fame with the short-lived London trip hop band Lisp, he moved to Israel after becoming a baal teshuvah and co-founded the Jewish hip hop group Shtar.

Career

Lisp

In 1995, Rubinstein, then living in East London, co-founded the trip hop band Lisp, together with vocalist Johnnie Gordon, bassist Jason Hall, drummer Adam Rich, and Disco Inferno's Paul Willmott on keyboards. Two years later, the band was signed to London Records' Mind Horizon imprint by Pete Tong. While with the label, the band released two singles, "Flatspin" and "Long Way to Climb" (the latter of which received airplay on XFM) and their debut album, Cycles, which released in 2000.

During this time, Rubinstein was encouraged by his father to start rediscovering his Jewish roots, ultimately leaving the group to avoid concerts that fell on the Jewish holidays. Lisp ultimately disbanded in 2001.

Shtar

Following his religious awakening, Rubinstein moved to Israel and began studying at the Aish HaTorah yeshiva in Jerusalem. There, he met rapper and fellow baal teshuvah Ori Murray, with whom he co-founded the Jewish hip hop group Shtar in 2006. They released their debut album, Infinity, in 2011; it was re-released the following year after the group signed to Shemspeed Records.

In December 2012, the group independently released the Boss EP, which he co-produced with Adrian Bushby and which featured a collaboration with Jewish rapper Nissim (then D. Black) on the song "Rabbit Hole".

Personal life
Rubinstein lives in Beit Shemesh with his wife and seven children and his favorite is his fourth "Yehuda Boruch".

Discography
With Lisp
Cycles (2000; London)

With Shtar
Infinity (2010; re-released 2012; Shemspeed)
Boss EP (2012; Heatseat)

Other
Shtar, Boss EP (2012) - co-produced with Adrian Bushby
Ari Goldwag, Am Echad (2013) - mixing, post-production

References

External links
 

Living people
Jewish English musicians
English Orthodox Jews
English male singer-songwriters
English male guitarists
English record producers
Jewish rock musicians
Jewish hip hop record producers
English emigrants to Israel
Baalei teshuva
21st-century English singers
21st-century British guitarists
21st-century British male singers
Year of birth missing (living people)